Maria Plass (born 1953) is a Swedish Moderate Party politician. She was member of the Riksdag from 2006 to 2018.

References

Maria Plass at the Riksdag website

Members of the Riksdag from the Moderate Party
Living people
1953 births
Women members of the Riksdag
21st-century Swedish women politicians